The 2nd Lithuanian Vanguard Regiment was a military unit of the Grand Duchy of Lithuania. The full name was 2nd Advance Guard Regiment Grand Hetman of Lithuania Josef Jelenski.

History

Origins 
Formed in 1776 from light cavalry.

Great Sejm 1788-1792
The regiment was stationed in Barysaw & Mazyr (1789), Marijampolė (1790), Ukmergė, Anykščiai (1792 October).

Kościuszko Uprising 
The regiment fought in the battle of Praga.

Uniforms

1776-1789 
The officers had red konfederatka with white cockade and plume, in addition to silver epaulettes. The towarzyszy had red belts. The ordinary soldier had no shoulder straps in contrast to all other ranks.

References 

Military units and formations established in 1776
Cavalry regiments of Lithuania